"Soul Kiss" is a song recorded by English-born Australian singer Olivia Newton-John for her twelfth studio album, Soul Kiss (1985). It was released as the lead single from the album on 25 September 1985 by MCA Records. The song was produced by John Farrar and written by Mark Goldenberg.

Charts

References

Songs about kissing
1985 singles
1985 songs
Olivia Newton-John songs
Song recordings produced by John Farrar
Songs written by Mark Goldenberg
MCA Records singles